Santiago Schaerer Kuenzli (June 6, 1834 – January 28, 1895), also known as Jakob Schaerer Kuenzli, was a Swiss immigrant, trader, colonizer and settler, founder and manager of several towns and settlements in South America.

The Beginning

Only son of a typical Swiss family, his parents were Jakob Schaerer, city councilor of Vordemwald, Aargau, and Johanna Barbara Kuenzli. He studied in his hometown, Vordemwald, and married Caroline Mueller Hess of Unterambringen, Baden. They had two sons, Emil Jakob and Hans Otto.

In 1861, his third newborn child died, and a few days later so did his wife. He was a widower at the  age 27. He ventured to the new world becoming a colonizer and the founder of numerous villages and colonies in South America. In Uruguay he was one of the founders and first settlers of Nueva Helvecia, then he moved to Argentina finally settling in Paraguay in 1869 during the final years of the Paraguayan War.

Work and legacy
He sailed from Hamburg in 1862 and arrived in Montevideo, Uruguay. Together with other Swiss settlers created Nueva Helvecia, the first Swiss colony in Uruguay. Then he travelled through Argentina, Carmen de Patagones and Santa Fe, and settled in 1869 in Paraguay, in the area of Caazapá, where he married Elizabeth Vera and had two other sons: Santiago Guillermo and Eduardo Schaerer. The latter would eventually become President of Paraguay and one of the most influential politicians in the history of this country. Years later his other sons, Emil Jakob and Hans Otto, came from Switzerland and also settled in Paraguay.

He continued his colonizing work in Paraguay in times of Bernardino Caballero, with the foundation of San Bernardino, Paraguay, the first German and Swiss colony in Paraguay, August 24, 1881. He continued on founding cities like Benjamin Aceval and Yegros.
Santiago Schaerer died in Asuncion, Paraguay, on January 28, 1895 at 60 years of age.

References

La Tribuna Archives

Prensa Latinoamericana / Paraguay www.red-redial.net/prensa-pais-paraguay.html

1834 births
1895 deaths
People from Zofingen District
Settlers
Swiss emigrants to Uruguay
Swiss emigrants to Argentina
Swiss emigrants to Paraguay